B&O may refer to:

Baltimore and Ohio Railroad
Bang & Olufsen, an electronics company
Bullets and Octane, a band
Business and occupation tax